Jack Canning (born 1999) is an Irish hurler who plays for Galway Senior Championship club Portumna and at inter-county level with the Galway senior hurling team. He usually lines out as a left corner-forward. His uncles, Ollie and Joe Canning, have also played for Galway.

Honours

Player

Galway
Leinster Under-21 Hurling Championship: 2018
All-Ireland Minor Hurling Championship: 2017

Individual

Awards
GAA Minor Star Hurling Team of the Year Award: 2017
All-Ireland Minor Hurling Final Man of the Match: 2017

References

1999 births
Living people
Portumna hurlers
Galway inter-county hurlers